John Henniker, 1st Baron Henniker (15 June 1724 – 18 April 1803), known previously as John Henniker then as Sir John Henniker, 2nd Baronet, from 1782 to 1800, was a British merchant and Member of Parliament.

Life

He was the son of John Henniker, of London, a Russian Merchant and Freeman of Rochester.

Henniker too became a merchant dealing in leather and furs. He was a supporter of the slave trade. He was also involved in politics and was appointed High Sheriff of Essex for 1758 before being elected to the House of Commons for Sudbury in 1761, an expensive contest which needed £5,500 to get him elected to the Commons.to spend £5,500 from the Duke of Newcastle's funds.  He held that seat until 1768, and then represented Dover from 1774 to 1784. He was elected a Fellow of the Royal Society in 1779.

He married Anne Major, daughter of Sir John Major, 1st Baronet. In 1782, Henniker succeeded his father-in-law as second Baronet of Worlingsworth Hall according to a special remainder. In 1800 he was raised to the Peerage of Ireland as Baron Henniker, of Stratford-upon-Slaney in the County of Wicklow.

Lord Henniker died in April 1803, aged 78, and was buried in Rochester Cathedral. The very large monument is by John Bacon.

He was succeeded in his titles by his eldest son John. His youngest son, the Hon. Sir Brydges Trecothic Henniker, became a Lieutenant-General in the Army and was created a Baronet in 1813.

The town of Henniker, New Hampshire in the United States, was named after Lord Henniker.

See also
Henniker Baronets of Newton Hall

Notes

References
Kidd, Charles, Williamson, David (editors). Debrett's Peerage and Baronetage (1990 edition). New York: St Martin's Press, 1990.

1724 births
1803 deaths
Peers of Ireland created by George III
British MPs 1761–1768
British MPs 1774–1780
British MPs 1780–1784
Members of the Parliament of Great Britain for Dover
High Sheriffs of Essex
Fellows of the Royal Society
Barons Henniker